Lasuba L. Wango is a South Sudanese politician who has served in the Cabinet of South Sudan as the Minister of Federal Affairs since 12 March 2020. A member of the Sudan People's Liberation Movement-in-Opposition party, Wango was appointed to the position as part of a power-sharing agreement which concluded the South Sudanese Civil War. In this position, Wango has overseen South Sudan's transition towards federalism.

References 

Year of birth missing (living people)
Date of birth missing (living people)
Place of birth missing (living people)
Government ministers of South Sudan
Sudan People's Liberation Movement politicians
Living people